Claudio Antonio Abarca Gálvez (born 7 January 1994) is a Chilean footballer who plays as a goalkeeper. He last played for Rodelindo Román.

Playing career
A product of Palestino youth system, Abarca played on loan at Barnechea, Trasandino and San Antonio Unido.

After leaving Palestino, he played for General Velásquez before moving to Venezuelan side Universidad Central in 2017.

Controversies
In 2016, as a player of General Velásquez, Abarca kicked on the head to Diego Díaz, player of Deportivo Estación Central, and was punished with four years with no playing for a Chilean club.

References

External links
 
 
 Claudio Abarca at Eurosport.com 

1994 births
Living people
Chilean footballers
Chilean expatriate footballers
Club Deportivo Palestino footballers
A.C. Barnechea footballers
Trasandino footballers
San Antonio Unido footballers
General Velásquez footballers
Deportes Iberia footballers
Rodelindo Román footballers
Chilean Primera División players
Primera B de Chile players
Segunda División Profesional de Chile players
Venezuelan Segunda División players
Chilean expatriate sportspeople in Venezuela
Expatriate footballers in Venezuela
Association football goalkeepers